Merily Toom (born 20 August 1994) is an Estonian football player who plays as a forward for Naiste Meistriliiga club Pärnu. She represented the Estonia national team from 2012 to 2017.

References

External links

1994 births
Living people
Women's association football forwards
Estonian women's footballers
Estonia women's international footballers
People from Lääne-Harju Parish
Pärnu JK players
FC Flora (women) players